The 2011 IPC Swimming European Championships was an international swimming competition. It was held in Berlin, Germany from 3 to 10 July. There were 440 swimmers from 36 European countries that took part, Ukraine topped the medal table with 105 medals including 41 gold medals, the country also broke eighteen swimming records.

Schedule

Medal table

References

World Para Swimming European Championships
2011 in swimming
Sports competitions in Berlin
International sports competitions hosted by Germany